The Āsholiō tribe of the Sholiō land are located in Sholiō Chiefdom, comprising Tsōk (Manchok), Āzankan (Zankan), Āzagwai (Gizagwai), Bondong, Vak (Kajim) among other districts and villages in Kaura Local Government Area. The people are known as Sholiō, while the language they speak is Āsholiō. They are one of three chiefdoms (Oeagwork, Āsholiō and Takad) in the local government. And they have a 1st Class Chief, in southern Kaduna state in the Middle Belt region of Nigeria.

The town has a post office. Federal School of Statistics,

Geography

Landscape
The elevation of Manchok is 896 m.

Climate

People and language

People

The people of Manchok and surrounding areas are the A̠sholyio (also spelt Asholio, Asholyia, Osholio; also called "Morwa" or "Moro'a" by the Hausa). The town is the headquarters of the chiefdom bearing their name.

Language

The Āsholiō speak Sholiō, one of the dialects of the Tyap language group, alongside six others - Fantswam, Gworok, Takad, Tyap proper, Tyeca̠rak and Tyuku. Jju also seems to be a part of these dialects.

Counting in Sholyio
 Āyung
 Āfiyanɡ
 Ātat
 Ānāai
 Āfwan
 Āteē
 Ānatat
 Ārināai
 Ākubuyung
 Swak
 Swak māng āyung
 Swak māng āfiyang
 Swak māng ātat
 Swak māng ānāai
 Swak māng āfwan
 Swak māng āteē
 Swak māng ānatat
 Swak māng ārināai
 Swak māng ākubuyung
 Swak-Āfiyang

Notable people
 Arc. Barnabas Bala Bantex, architect, politician
 Maj. Gen. Joshua Madaki (rtd.), military service
 Agwam Tagwai Sambo (OFR) paramount ruler

See also
 List of villages in Kaduna State

References

Populated places in Kaduna State